The FC Basel 1899–1900 season was their seventh season since the club's foundation on 15 November 1893. In this season they did not compete for the Swiss championship. The club's chairman was Charlie Volderauer, who was chairman between 1896 and 1900. He stood down at the AGM and Ernst-Alfred Thalmann was elected as the new club chairman. FC Basel played their home games in the Landhof, in the Quarter Kleinbasel.

Overview 
The first national championship in Switzerland took place in 1897–98. This championship is considered as unofficial because it was not organized by the Swiss Football Association (SFA; founded in 1895). FC Basel did not participate in this first championship. But they did in the second edition during the last season. Basel did not compete in the championship this season either. But they have participated in every season since.

Georges Fürstenberger was appointed as team captain by the club's board of directors under chairman Charlie Volderauer. As captain Fürstenberger led the team trainings and was responsible for the line-ups. Basel played 16 friendly games in the season, six were won, two drawn and eight ended with a defeat. The team scored 31 goals, but only seven goal scorers are documented, and they conceded 37 goals.

Eleven of these friendly games were played at home in the Landhof, five were played away. As in the previous season, all the friendly games were played against Swiss teams. Among the opponents were reigning Swiss champions Anglo-American Club Zürich and Basel won both the home game and the return match. They also played twice against Zürich, but both games ended with a defeat. Further there were two games against local rivals Old Boys and these were both lost as well. The two games against FC Concordia Zürich ended with a win at home but a defeat away. The two games against Biel-Bienne ended with a home defeat, but an away win.

Players 

 

 

 

 Players who left the squad

Results 

Legend

Friendly matches

Early season

Spring

References

Sources 
 Rotblau: Jahrbuch Saison 2014/2015. Publisher: FC Basel Marketing AG. 
 Die ersten 125 Jahre. Publisher: Josef Zindel im Friedrich Reinhardt Verlag, Basel. 
 FCB squad 1899-1900 at fcb-archiv.ch
''(NB: Despite all efforts, the editors of these books and the authors in "Basler Fussballarchiv" have failed to be able to identify all the players, their date and place of birth or date and place of death, who played in the games during the early years of FC Basel. Much documentation for this season is missing, most goal scorers remain unknown.)

External links
 FC Basel official site

FC Basel seasons
Basel